The discography of Damien Leith, an Australian singer-songwriter, consists of nine studio albums, one live album, two EPs and 19 singles.

Leith won the fourth series of Australian Idol in 2006, and signed a record deal with Sony BMG and has also released albums via Social Family Records and Ambition Records.

Studio albums

Live albums

Extended plays

Singles

Music videos

References

External links

Official website

Discographies of Australian artists
Pop music discographies
Rhythm and blues discographies